Kholagaun may refer to:

Kholagaun, Sindhuli, Nepal
Kholagaun, Western Rukum, Nepal